Rani Jai Higher Secondary School is an educational institution in North Kerala, situated at Nirmalagiri barely a mile away from Kuthuparamba, Kannur district.  The school has classes from lower kindergarten to standard 12 and follows the Kerala syllabus in English medium

The foundation of the school is interconnected with the adjacent Nirmalagiri college. The college was initially a women's college under the diocese of Thalassery.  The Homescience department of that college felt a need of nursery school to train their students in teaching, that's how Rani Jai Higher Secondary School started very humbly in 1972.  It started admission to 1st standard in 1974 and since then the staff is powered by the Sisters of the Adoration of the Blessed Sacrament (SABS) congregation.  The first batch of SSLC (Secondary School Leaving Certificate) exam passed out in 1987 securing 100% success to school. The school has the strength of more than 3,000 students now.

References

Kerala government site

Educational institutions established in 1972
High schools and secondary schools in Kerala
Schools in Kannur district